Auger-Aliassime is a surname. Notable people with the surname include:

 Félix Auger-Aliassime (born 2000), Canadian tennis player, brother of Malika
 Malika Auger-Aliassime (born 1998), Canadian tennis player, sister of Félix

See also
 Auger (surname)

Compound surnames